is a song recorded by Japanese pop girl group Morning Musume. Written and produced by Tsunku, it was released on June 9, 2010 by Zetima in four editions: the normal edition and limited A, B, and C versions. The limited editions each contain a different version of the promotional video.

Promotion
The b-side  was chosen as the theme song for the 2010 Japan Expo in Paris, France, at which Morning Musume is expected to appear on July 2, 2010.

The group appeared on Music Japan, alongside other female idol groups, and performed "Seishun Collection".

Also at Morning Musume Concert Tour 2011 Aki ~Takahashi Ai Graduation~, Morning Musume and their 10th generation, Ikubo Haruna, Ishida Ayumi, Masaki Sato and Kudo Haruka performed together Morning Musume 43rd single, Seishun Collection's B-side Tomo.

Track listing

Charts

Members
 5th generation: Ai Takahashi, Risa Niigaki
 6th generation: Eri Kamei, Sayumi Michishige, Reina Tanaka
 8th generation: Aika Mitsui, Junjun, Linlin

Seishun Collection

Main Voc: Ai Takahashi, Risa Niigaki, Eri Kamei,  Reina Tanaka

Center Voc: Sayumi Michishige

Minor Voc: Aika Mitsui, Junjun, Linlin

Tomo

Main Voc: Ai Takahashi, Reina Tanaka

Center Voc: Risa Niigaki, Eri Kamei, Sayumi Michishige, Aika Mitsui, Junjun,  Linlin

References

External links
 Seishun Collection entry on the Hello! Project website 

2010 singles
Japanese-language songs
Morning Musume songs
Song recordings produced by Tsunku
Songs written by Tsunku
Zetima Records singles
2010 songs